Roger Woodward  (born 20 December 1942) is an Australian classical pianist, composer, conductor and teacher.

Life and career

Early life 
The youngest of four children, Roger Woodward was born in Sydney where he received first piano lessons from Winifred Pope. His mother and second sister were amateur violinists and his father and elder sister sang in the local Chatswood Church of Christ choir. On his first day at Chatswood Public School, he sat next to Peter Kraus, a boy who had survived the Auschwitz train four years before. The six-year olds became lifelong friends and, as he came to know Peter, his brother Paul, and the Kraus family, their story impacted his emerging vision and personal development. He attended the Conservatorium High School and matriculated from North Sydney Boys' Technical High School with a Commonwealth scholarship.

Woodward's early studies of Bach organ works with Peter Verco led to his immersion in Bach's cantatas and passion music and training in church music with Kenneth R. Long, music master at St Andrew's Cathedral, Sydney. He performed for the papal organist Fernando Germani and Sir Eugene Goossens, chief conductor of the Sydney Symphony Orchestra, after which he entered the Sydney Conservatorium in the piano class of Alexander Sverjensky (pupil of Alexander Glazunov, Sergei Rachmaninoff and Alexander Siloti) and the composition class of Raymond Hanson.

In 1963, Woodward graduated with distinction from the Sydney Conservatorium and the Sydney Teachers' College. In the same year, he founded and developed plans for the housing and funding of a competitive, international and quadrennial rostrum originally named the Sydney Piano Competition, together with the support of a wide circle of Sydney musicians and enthusiasts, which was achieved during 1972 to 76.

From 1963 to 1965, Woodward continued his organ studies with Faunce Allman while carrying out full-time duties as a choir director and secondary school teacher. During this period he mastered works by Australian composers and Tōru Takemitsu, John Cage Olivier Messiaen and his pupils: Alexander Goehr, Karlheinz Stockhausen, Iannis Xenakis, Pierre Boulez and Jean Barraqué. In 1964, he won the Commonwealth Finals of the Australian Broadcasting Corporation's Instrumental and Vocal Competition, the prize for which was to perform throughout Australia with the six ABC State Radio orchestras and in multiple radio and television broadcasts.From 1965–69, he pursued postgraduate studies at the National Chopin Academy of Music, Warsaw, with Zbigniew Drzewiecki. There he befriended the Cuban pedagogue Jorge Luis Herrero Dante and soon after, began working with Cuban composers Sergio Barroso, Juan Blanco, Leo Brouwer, and Carlos Fariñas.

During visits to London (1966–68), Woodward prepared Chopin manuscripts owned by British musicologist Arthur Hedley, before including them in recitals at the Wigmore Hall and South Bank. Contrary to some reports, Woodward did not enter the International Chopin Piano Competition. However, he regularly performed Chopin's music in Poland: at the Twenty-Third International Chopin Festival, Duszniki-Zdrój (1968), at Żelazowa Wola (Chopin's birthplace), at the Kraków Spring Festival (1968) and at the Ostrowski Palace on several occasions. He also performed the complete works of Chopin (by heart) at the Sydney Festival 1983-1985 in support of the Solidarność Movement to raise public awareness of the importance of Poland's struggle for human rights.

In 1967, Woodward played for Lina Prokofieva in Warsaw and was soon invited to perform with the Warsaw National Philharmonic Orchestra then throughout Poland. Two years later, he toured extensively with the Wiener Trio performed in Cuba as guest of Casa de las Américas and at the Paris Jeunesses Musicales where the UNESCO Rostrum's two principal jury members, Yehudi Menuhin and Jack Lang, noticed Woodward's performances of his own compositions alongside works of J. S. Bach, Chopin, Scriabin and Prokofiev. Soon after he made his debut with the Royal Philharmonic Orchestra at the Royal Festival Hall, London and on Menuhin's recommendation, his first four recordings for EMI.

In 1971, Woodward performed his first recital at London's Queen Elizabeth Hall with premieres of works by Richard Meale, Ross Edwards, Leo Brouwer, Takemitsu and Barraqué, after which he was invited by Robert Slotover, CEO, Allied Artists Management, to co-found a series of new music concerts known as the London Music Digest at the Roundhouse.

Digest performances with Barraqué were followed by a close working relationship with the composer on his Sonate pour piano at the EMI Abbey Road Studios, then in Paris and at the Royan Festival. Woodward also worked with John Cage at the Roundhouse for the British premiere of HPSCHD for ICES (International Carnival of Experimental Sound) and the BBC Proms. Further collaborations were undertaken with Stockhausen at the Festival Hall, London, and with Takemitsu at the Roundhouse,  London's Decca Studios, and the Music Today Festival, Tokyo.A partnership also began with Pierre Boulez and the BBC Symphony Orchestra at the Roundhouse, the Cheltenham Festival, and with Bernard Rands for the premiere of Mésallianz for piano and orchestra. His collaboration with Iannis Xenakis 1974–96 extended from France to the UK, Austria, Italy, and the United States, during which Xenakis dedicated three works to him, as did Rolf Gehlhaar, Takemitsu, Anne Boyd, and Morton Feldman. Performing their works established his reputation as the leading exponent of new music of his time.

Steeped in church music and traditional repertoire, Woodward trained throughout his early life to perform established works side by side with more recent music as part of a belief that music was the essential expression of an experimental process. His concerts reflected this belief even though such programming was widely considered unorthodox for the time. He placed new works by Anne Boyd and Richard Meale alongside those of Scriabin, late Beethoven and J.S. Bach at the Edinburgh Festival. In Los Angeles, for the first half of three Los Angeles Philharmonic concerts, he performed Liszt's Totentanz and Xenakis alongside J.S. Bach solo harpsichord concertos with the Tokyo String Quartet. In recital, he often programmed traditional eighteenth- and nineteenth-century repertoire with new, little known, or neglected works such as those he championed by experimental fin de siècle Russian, Ukrainian and early Soviet composers Alexander Scriabin, Alexander Mosolov, Nikolai Roslavets, Ivan Vyshnegradsky, Nikolai Obukhov, Aleksei Stanchinsky. His performances of the complete works of Scriabin attracted exceptional critical reviews.

Middle years 

That September, he participated in the inaugural celebrations of the Sydney Opera House as soloist for an extended tour with the six principal Australian Broadcasting Commission orchestras and premiered a series of ABC commissions, including a septet, As It Leaves the Bell, by Anne Boyd for piano, two harps and percussion.

January 1974 saw Woodward invited by Witold Rowicki on an extensive tour of the US with the Warsaw Philharmonic Orchestra, during which he made his debut at Carnegie Hall. That year, Woodward founded Music Rostrum Australia at the Sydney Opera House where he collaborated with Australian composer Richard Meale and guests Luciano Berio, Cathy Berberian, David Gulpilil and Yuji Takahashi. He began performing with the Cleveland Orchestra directed by Lorin Maazel, and became a regular guest in Los Angeles with the Philharmonic directed by Zubin Mehta, with whom he subsequently performed (1972–89) in New York, Tel Aviv, and Paris. He also performed at outdoor venues including the Hollywood Bowl (Stravinsky); Odéon of Herodes Atticus, Athens  On four occasions he performed with Cecil Taylor in the Gulbenkian Park, Lisbon (1986–92) and on several occasions at The Domain with the Sydney Symphony Orchestra (Beethoven and Tchaikovsky). In traditions pioneered by Dame Nellie Melba and Percy Grainger, he performed extensively throughout Central and Regional Australia, often in outdoor venues.

It was the year when Woodward first encountered Anne Boyd's a cappella masterpiece: As I Crossed a Bridge of Dreams, which made a profound impact upon him. Then in June and July, as Dmitri Shostakovich lay dying in a Moscow Cancer Clinic, he made the first complete recording in the West of his 24 Preludes and Fugues, Op. 87, in tribute to the great Russian composer.

In 1977, he premiered Feldman's solo work Piano (which was dedicated to Woodward)  in Baden- Baden, commissioned Elisabeth Lutyens for a work for solo piano and two chamber orchestras, (Nox, Op.118), and, following the Valldemosa Festival, began a collaboration with Alberto Ginastera which continued until 1979. 1978 saw his first performance of the complete cycle of Beethoven's 32 Piano Sonatas at the Adelaide Festival, repeated at Kenwood House, London, the following year and in 1980 for the Sydney Festival. In the same year he premiered the Xenakis solo piano work Mists in Edinburgh (in the composer's presence). A further performance of the Beethoven cycle followed at the Queen Elizabeth Hall, London. At London's Institute of Contemporary Arts, he gave the world premiere of Morton Feldman's Triadic Memories in the presence of the composer—a ninety-minute masterpiece which heralded the composer's late period.

In 1982, Woodward performed the five Beethoven Piano Concertos on three occasions: with Elyakum Shapirra and the Adelaide Chamber Orchestra, and twice with Georg Tintner, first with the Melbourne Symphony Orchestra and then with the Queensland Theatre Orchestra. During this time he was active for the Polish Solidarność Trades Union Movement, leading to his being banned from performing throughout Eastern Europe. As the ban took hold elsewhere. it was accompanied by misleading statements, rumours and damaging criticism from the Soviet Block. Throughout this period the artist remained loyal to the Solidarność Trades Union Movement, leading to his being banned not only in Eastern Europe but, unexpectedly, by some leading Western concert managements, festival directors, and symphony orchestra administrators. Despite this, he was the recipient of a second work (of three dedicated to him) by Xenakis—his third and final composition for piano and orchestra—Keqrops, which was premiered in November 1986 at the Lincoln Center, NY, with New York Philharmonic Orchestra under Mehta, The following year, he repeated Keqrops for the BBC Proms (again in the composer's presence). That same year Woodward founded the Sydney Spring International Festival of New Music which continued until 2001.

Despite the downfall of Communism, the former Soviet disinformation campaign continued, with repeated attempts to remove Solidarność activists' credibility and careers through an ongoing embargo. Nevertheless, Woodward worked with the New York, Los Angeles, Beijing and Israel Philharmonic orchestras, five London orchestras, the Hallé Orchestra, London Sinfonietta, London Mozart Players, London Brass, RTE Radio, the BBC Northern Symphony Orchestra, the Scottish National Orchestra, the Estonian National Orchestra, the Latvian National Symphony Orchestra, the Leipzig Gewandhaus Orchestra and Berlin Radio Orchestra, L'orchestre National de Paris, L'orchestre National de Lille, Orchestre Philharmonique de Radio France, the Mahlerjugendorchester, EEC Youth Orchestra, the Australian Youth Orchestra, and the Budapest and Prague Chamber Orchestras. He also collaborated with the following artists: Charles Dutoit, Lorin Maazel, Yoel Levi, Edo de Waart, Sir Charles Mackerras, Enrique Bátiz Campbell, Kurt Masur, Nello Santi, Paavo Berglund, Moshe Atzmon, Marin Alsop, Henry Kripps, Tibor Paul, Albert Rosen, Werner Andreas Albert, Matthias Bamert, Henry Lewis, Isaiah Jackson, Dean Dixon, Georg Tintner, Hans-Hubert Schönzeler, Tan Lihua, Sir William Southgate, Simon Romanos, Gyula Németh, David Atherton, Erich Leinsdorf, Eliahu Inbal, James Judd, Walter Susskind, Herbert Blomstedt, Georges Tzipine, Arturo Tamayo, Robert Busan, Lukas Foss, Péter Eötvös, Zakarias Grafilo, Sir John Pritchard, Sir Roger Norrington, Sir Andrew Davis, Willem van Otterloo, Hiroyuki Iwaki, Lamberto Gardelli, Colman Pearce, and Sir Alexander Gibson. Although the embargo was extensive, Woodward and other Australian artists were invited by Symphony Australia to perform a limited number of orchestral concerts, after the personal intervention of Prime Minister Paul Keating. 

Throughout this period, he performed with the Arditti, Tokyo, New Zealand, Australian and Sydney string quartets, the Australia Ensemble, the Edinburgh String Quartet, JACK Quartet and the Alexander String Quartet, with whom he recorded Beethoven, Chopin, Shostakovich, and Robert Greenberg. He also collaborated with harpsichordist George Malcolm and jazz pianist Cecil Taylor in Lisbon, Paris, for the Patras Festival, and for extensive tours of the UK Contemporary Music Network from 1987–94. He worked with musicologists Charles Rosen, Paul Griffiths, H. C. Robbins-Landon, Richard Toop, Paul M. Ellison, Nouritza Matossian and Sharon Kanach; violinists Philippe Hirschhorn, Ivry Gitlis, Ilya Grubert, Winfried Rademacher,  Asmira-Woodward-Page and Wanda Wiłkomirska; violist ; cellists Rohan de Saram, Nathan Waks, Jacopo Scalfi and David Pereira; Synergy Percussion, Chris Dench, Adrian Jack, Elena Kats-Chernin, Alessandro Solbiati; the flautists Laura Chislett, Pierre Yves- Artaud; pianists: Yuji Takahashi, Alexander Gavrylyuk, Stephanie McCallum, Robert Curry, Noel Lee and Simon Tedeschi. He also worked with James Dillon, James Morrison, David Gulpilil, Robyn Archer and Frank Zappa. Nominated by Prime Minister Gough Whitlam and Premier Neville Wran, Woodward became a Companion of the Order of Australia (AC) in 1992. The following year, Polish President Lech Wałęsa, conferred his nation's highest honour upon a foreigner—the Order of Merit of the Republic of Poland (OM).

During the 1990s Woodward toured China twice, co-founded and directed the Kötschach-Mauthner Musikfest (1992–97), the Joie et Lumière concert series (under the patronage of Lord Paul Hamlyn and Lady Helen Hamlyn) at Château de Bagnols, Bourgogne 1997–2004, in tribute to the memory of Sviatoslav Richter, and an annual concert series—the Sydney Spring International Festival of New Music 1989–2001, when he collaborated with Arvo Pärt and Horatiu Radulescu. He commissioned a series of three piano concertos from Larry Sitsky. The first was premiered at the 1994 Sydney Spring International Festival of New Music and recorded in 1997. In 1995 it was selected by the UNESCO International Rostrum of Composers for citation. Between 1992-98 he was awarded four doctorates honoris causa and in 1999, completed the degree of Doctor of Music at the University of Sydney.

Woodward's performances as a conductor received wide critical acclaim: with the Adelaide Chamber Orchestra; the Sydney Dance Company at the Sydney Opera House in a collaboration with its artistic director Graeme Murphy in twenty-five performances of the Xenakis ballet Kraanerg; the Shanghai Conservatory Orchestra; in the UK for BBC2 Television; with the Alpha Centauri Ensemble (twenty-three musicians) at Scala di Milano; and in the  the Academia Santa Cecilia, Rome; at the Biblioteca Salaborsa, Bologna; and for the Sydney Spring International Festival of New Music (1989–2001). His compositions have been performed in Poland, Australia, Cuba, the Netherlands, France, and the UK at the Almeida International New Music Festival (August, 1990). His work Sound by Sound—for live and recorded pianos, percussion and live electronics—was commissioned by the Festival d'automne à Paris for the bicentennial celebrations of the French Revolution.

From eighteen Woodward taught in Sydney, then in Warsaw, during his studies at the Chopin National University. He taught in London and at the BBC Dartington master classes, was chair of Music at the University of New England (Australia) and chair of the School of Music, San Francisco State University where he is currently professor.  Woodward lectured and/or gave master classes in Germany, Finland, Poland, Cuba, Mexico, the UK, US, China, New Zealand and Australia. He is a regular guest of international piano competition juries. Some of his students include Norman Lawrence, Carmel Gammal (née Ettinger), Geoffrey Abdallah, Peter Donohoe and Alan Kogosowski.

Reception
His iconic performances and recordings with Pierre Boulez, Jean Barraqué, Iannis Xenakis, Karlheinz Stockhausen, Sylvano Bussotti, John Cage, Morton Feldman, Anne Boyd, and Toru Takemitsu are established classics, characterized by unusual precision and penetrating insight. 

Innovative interpretations of J.S. Bach,  Beethoven, Debussy,  Scriabin,  and Shostakovich provide a strong and original direction in a redefinition of traditions, sometimes reviewed as unorthodox for their modernity.

Principal awards and honours
1976: Członkiem Korespondentem, Towarzystwo im. Fryderyka Chopina, Poland
1980: Officer of the Most Excellent Order of the British Empire, UK
1981: Greater London Metropolitan Police, Citation for Bravery, UK
1988: Ancient Order of Bréifne
1992: Companion of the Order of Australia
1993: Commander Cross, Order of Merit, Republic of Poland
1997: National Living Treasure, National Trust of Australia
1998: Doctor of Laws, honoris causa, University of Alberta, Canada
2001: Centenary Medal, Australia
2004: Chevalier dans l'ordre des arts et des lettres, Republic of France
2011: Gloria Artis (gold class) medal, Republic of  Poland 
2019: Honorary fellow, Australian Academy of the Humanities

Principal recordings and publications 

Woodwards's principal recordings have been issued by ABC Classics (Australia), Accord (France), Artworks (Australia), BMG, Col Legno (Munich), CPO, Decca, Deutsche Grammophon, EMI, Etcetera Records BV, Explore Records, Foghorn Classics (San Francisco), JB (Australia), Polskie Nagrania, Sipario Dischi (Milano), Unicorn (UK), Universal, Warner and RCA Red Seal (UK) for whom Woodward made the first complete recording (in the West) of Dmitry Shostakovich's Twenty-four Preludes and Fugues, Op. 87, at the time of the composer's death. It was rereleased by Celestial Harmonies (2010).

Woodward's live concerts have been recorded for ABC Radio/TV, BBC Radio/TV, Radio NZ, RAI, Radio France, Radio/TV Cuba, Hong Kong Radio, Radio China, Radio/TV Japan, Polish Radio/TV, RTE (Dublin), multiple German radio stations including Radio Berlin; Hilversum Radio (Netherlands), for the UNESCO Rostrum/Paris and You Tube. DVDs have been issued Allied Artists (UK), BBC TV Productions, Chanan Productions (UK), Foghorn Classics (San Francisco), Kultur (China), Polygram (Australia), Smith Street Films (Australia) and the Sydney Dance Company.

Three Celestial Harmonies compact disc recordings were named "Record of the Month" by MusicWeb International: Debussy Préludes Books 1 and 2 (March 2010); Roger Woodward In Concert (October 2013) and Prokofiev Works for Solo Piano 1908-1938 (April 2013),this recording was nominated Best Classical Album at Australia's 1992 Aria awards. A recording for Etcetera BV of Scriabin's Piano Works was  "Record of the Month" on Musicweb International (July 2002).The Etcetera BV release (1989) of Xenakis' Kraanerg with the Alpha Centauri Ensemble directed by Roger Woodward was selected by the music critics of The Sunday Times, UK, as one of the most outstanding releases of that year: " A stringent and sustained electro acoustical experience."

Woodward was the recipient of the Preis der Deutschen Schallplattenkritik (2007), for performances of J. S. Bach's Partitas BWV 826 and 830, and Chromatic Fantasia and Fugue, BWV 903. This recording was also named one of the finest of the year by MusicWeb International (2008) and nominated as Best Classical Album at Australia's 1993 Aria awards. His performances of J. S. Bach's Well-Tempered-Clavier was Editor's Choice for The Gramophone, UK (February 2010). Both were recorded by Ulrich Kraus and produced by Eckart Rahn as part of twelve projects for Celestial Harmonies (2006–15).

In 1991, Woodward shared the Diapason d'or with fellow Australian and senior ABC recording producer Ralph Lane, for their recording of Morton Feldman's solo piano music (ABC Classics). This recording was Record of the Month in April 1991 (Télérama, Paris) and reviewed: "Roger Woodward – à qui Triadic Memories est dédiée – est tout bonnement sublime." In June, 1991, it was reviewed by Le monde de la musique: "Il fallait un pianiste rompu à toutes les difficultés, et doté de moyens pianistiques supérieurs pour rendre justice à ces oeuvres-limits; c'est Roger Woodward, et il est parfaite."

Ralph Lane recorded a wide range of live and studio projects with Woodward (1988-2018) some of which were named Record of the Month, including the aforementioned Prokofiev, Scriabin and Xenakis recordings. In 1991, he was recipient of the Ritmo Prize (Spain) for his Etcetera BV recording of Takemitsu's piano music (also produced by Lane). In June 1991, the same recording was Record of the Month (Télérama, Paris  (January, 1991) and reviewed:  "Roger Woodward est épatant. Enregistrement essentiel". In 2008, his recording of The Music of Frédéric Chopin was nominated Best Classical Album at Australia's Aria Awards.

In 2015, ABC Classics/Universal released A Concerto Collection comprising ten live concert and four studio performances of: J. S. Bach Keyboard Concerto in D minor, BWV 1052, Haydn Keyboard Concerto in F major, Hob XVIII, 6, Beethoven Piano Concerto No. 3 in  C minor, Op.37, Beethoven Piano Concerto No. 4 in G major, Op. 58, Chopin Piano Concerto No. 1 in E minor, Op.11, Rachmaninoff Piano Concerto No. 2  in C minor Op.18, Scriabin Piano Concerto in  F-sharp major, Op. 20, Scriabin Symphony No. 5 Op. 60 (Prometheus), Prokofiev Piano Concerto No. 3 in C major Op.26, Schoenberg Piano Concerto Op. 42, Larry Sitsky Piano Concerto No. 1,  Barry Conyngham Double Concerto for violin and piano, Qu Xiao-Song Huang, and Xenakis Kraanerg.

He is published by Routledge Press, UK, HarperCollins, Kindle, the Greenway Press, N.Y., the Pendragon Press, NY, Praeger, New York and the E. R. P. Musikverlag, Berlin. He has published chapters in two monographs for the University of Sydney, Jean Barraqué in Matters of the Mind, edited by Catherine Runcey (2001), and Music And Change: Some Considerations of the Sonata quasi una fantasia in C-sharp minor, Op.27, No.2, in Literature and Aesthetics'' (1998).

Personal life 
Woodward has three children: Asmira, a concert violinist (mother, Prudence Page). Benjamin, director of Academy Tennis (mother, Patricia Ludgate to whom Woodward was married from 1989 to 2009), and foster son, Elroy Palmer.

Bibliography

See also
 List of Roger Woodward's principal first performances, recordings, and publications

References

External links
 Roger Woodward Homepage
 
 
 
 Woodward's official Youtube channel:https://youtube.com/c/RogerWoodwardPiano

1942 births
Living people
Australian classical pianists
Male classical pianists
San Francisco State University faculty
Sydney Conservatorium of Music alumni
North Sydney Technical High School alumni
Chopin University of Music alumni 
Musicians from Sydney
Fellows of the Australian Academy of the Humanities
Companions of the Order of Australia
Australian Officers of the Order of the British Empire
Recipients of the Centenary Medal
Chevaliers of the Ordre des Arts et des Lettres
 Class 1
Recipients of the Gold Medal for Merit to Culture – Gloria Artis
Australian musicians
21st-century classical pianists
21st-century Australian musicians